The Radioplane XKD4R, known by the company designation RP-70, was an American target drone developed by the Radioplane Division of the Northrop Corporation. Although it was not produced in quantity, it was developed into the successful AQM-38.

Design and development
The XKD4R was an air-launched target drone, powered by a single Aerojet solid-fuel rocket engine which exhausted through nozzles located at the trailing edges of the wing. Constructed largely of molded plastic, it utilized an unconventional control configuration, consisting of three canard control fins located forwards, one on top of and one on either side of the fuselage, and fixed horizontal fins at the rear. An autopilot controlled the drone after launch; at the end of an approximately nine-minute flight, a parachute was deployed for recovery.

Operational history
Conducting its first flight in January 1958, the XKD4R-1 was tested extensively by the United States Navy, launches usually being conducted from McDonnell F3H Demon fighters. Although satisfactory, the RP-70 was not produced; instead, the improved RP-76 was developed, flying in 1959 and being produced for both the U.S. Air Force and Navy, becoming the AQM-38 in 1962.

Specifications (XKD4R-1)

See also

References
Citations

Bibliography

KD4R
Target drones of the United States
1950s United States special-purpose aircraft
Rocket-powered aircraft
Canard aircraft
Mid-wing aircraft
Aircraft first flown in 1958